Angel of Mine is a compilation album released in 2001 by German composer and singer Frank Duval.

Track listing
"Angel Of Mine" - 4:14
"Touch My Soul" - 4:02
"Children Of Our Time" - 4:15
"Ways" - 4:09
"On The Wing" - 3:01
"Give Me Your Love" - 4:28
"Lord" - 8:11
"If I Could Fly Away" - 3:53
"Children of Goods" - 7:59
"Melody of Sadness" - 2:56
"Love What's Your Face" - 4:06
"Galaxis Zena" - 5:54
"It Was Love" - 4:52
"Love" - 3:51
"And At The End Of Every Street" - 4:02

2001 compilation albums
Frank Duval albums
Albums produced by Frank Duval